Trine Bakke (born 11 January 1975 in Trondheim) is a retired Norwegian alpine skier. By the end of her career, she had won two World cup competitions in slalom (St. Anton 1999 and Maribor, 2000). 
The highlight in her career came at the WC 1999 in Vail where she won the bronze medal in slalom behind Zali Steggall and Pernilla Wiberg.

Bakke competed in alpine skiing for Norway at the 1994, 1998, and 2002 Winter Olympics.

References

External links
 
 

1975 births
Norwegian female alpine skiers
Olympic alpine skiers of Norway
Alpine skiers at the 1994 Winter Olympics
Alpine skiers at the 1998 Winter Olympics
Alpine skiers at the 2002 Winter Olympics
Living people
Sportspeople from Trondheim